The 2012–13 Ranji Trophy was the 79th season of the Ranji Trophy. It was contested by 27 teams divided into three groups of nine teams each. The top three teams from Groups A and B proceeded to the quarterfinals along with the top two teams from Group C. Mumbai won this year's trophy for the 40th time by beating Saurashtra in the final at the Wankhede.

The season had a different grouping system compared to that of the previous seasons, which had Elite and Plate divisions. The new system also increased the number of matches of the tournament. The points awarded to outright wins were increased from five to six in order to encourage results. The knock-out matches will be played across five days instead of four. All these changes were recommended by the BCCI's Technical Committee in June 2012.

Points system
27 teams were divided into three groups of nine teams each. The top three teams from Groups A and B proceed to the quarterfinals along with the top two teams from Group C. The winner of this knock-out tournament wins the Ranji Trophy. These knock-out matches are decided on the first innings result if the final result is a draw.

Points in the group stage of the tournament are awarded as follows:

Groups

Group A
 Bengal
 Gujarat
 Hyderabad
 Madhya Pradesh
 Mumbai
 Punjab
 Railways
 Rajasthan
 Saurashtra

Group B
 Baroda
 Delhi
 Haryana
 Karnataka
 Maharashtra
 Odisha
 Tamil Nadu
 Uttar Pradesh
 Vidarbha

Group C
 Andhra
 Assam
 Goa
 Himachal Pradesh
 Jammu and Kashmir
 Jharkhand
 Kerala
 Services
 Tripura

League table

Group A 

Group B

Group C

Knockouts

Knockout tree

Quarterfinals

Semifinals

Final

Statistics

Most runs

Most wickets

See also
2013 Irani Cup

References

External links
Ranji Trophy

Ranji Trophy seasons
Ranji Trophy